Ebensfeld station is a railway station in the municipality of Ebensfeld, located in the Lichtenfels district in Upper Franconia, Germany.

References

External links
Construction work information of Deutsche Bahn 

Railway stations in Bavaria
Railway stations in Germany opened in 1846
1846 establishments in Bavaria
Buildings and structures in Lichtenfels (district)